The following is a list of international prime ministerial trips made by Shehbaz Sharif during his term as the Prime Minister of Pakistan from April 2022 to present.

Summary of international trips

As of March 2023, Shehbaz Sharif has made 19 foreign trips to 11 countries since his Premiership began on 11 April 2022.

2022

2023

References

Prime Ministerial trips
Shehbaz Sharif
2022 in international relations
Diplomacy-related lists